Evergestis anticlina is a moth in the family Crambidae. It is found in Argentina and Bolivia.

References

Moths described in 1959
Evergestis
Moths of South America